The Siege of Sidney Street is a 1960 British historical drama film co-directed by Robert S. Baker and Monty Berman. It stars Donald Sinden, Nicole Berger and Kieron Moore.

The film dramatises the 1909 Tottenham Outrage - a bungled wages-snatch which resulted in the murder of a police officer and a ten-year-old bystander as well as the two armed robbers - and the 1911 Siege of Sidney Street, in which armed police surrounded a house in East End of London occupied by a gang who had killed three police officers during a bungled attempt to break into a jeweller's shop. The film depicts the two events as both taking place in 1911, the work of the same gang.

It was filmed at Ardmore Studios in Ireland, with shots of Dublin standing in for pre-First World War East London.

Cast

Production
Donald Sinden, then a contract star for the Rank Organisation at Pinewood Studios, recalled "The scene in the blazing room we filmed in the studio and I was vastly intrigued to watch the way the special effects department created the illusion. They began by making everything on set completely fireproof. They then spread an inflammable jelly over the sections that were seen to be burning and just before "Action" it was set alight. Tables and chairs and curtains blazed away and at the end of the scene the flames were extinguished ready for the next Take. It was remarkable. Nothing was damaged. Leonard Sachs, playing Svaars (uncredited) was left in the room with the revolver; his clothes had also been fireproofed and in the long-shot flames licked from the jelly which had been put on his back. For the next shot, his close-up, he was having the jelly placed strategically on his shoulders and arms. I was talking to someone in the crew when another of the crew approached and whispered to his colleague 'Have they fireproofed his hair?' 'No, I don't think they have. It would take 20-minutes.' I was later informed that had Leonard suffered any damage, the insurance company would have paid up, but twenty minutes of the crew's time, on an hourly rate, merely to fireproof an actor's hair would have had to have been paid for by the film company. Thankfully Leonard only suffered mild burns to his hair and scalp!"

References

External links

 

1960 films
1960s historical drama films
Films set in 1911
Films directed by Robert S. Baker
British historical drama films
Films with screenplays by Jimmy Sangster
1960 drama films
1960s English-language films
1960s British films